TurnTable Certification System of Nigeria (TCSN), founded by the Nigeria music magazine TurnTable, to represent the music recording certification in Nigeria based on the number of albums and singles paid streams and digital downloads. The certification is not automatic; for an award to be made, the manager, distributor, or record label must first request certification from its website.

History
On 20 March 2021, TurnTable announced its partnership with the Nigerian music community WeTalkSound, to lunch a music recording certification called the Recording Certification of Nigeria (abbreviated as "RCN") to award Gold, Platinum, and Diamond certifications to singles, albums, and videos. Prior to its launch, RCN began operation on March 2021, certifying only music videos with the typical Gold and Platinum benchmarks, awarding gold certifications for 2,500 units, platinum for 5,000 units, and multi-platinum starting from 10,000 units. In a conversation with The Native; Dolapo Amusat, Ayomide Oriowo, Fortune Osayawe, and Similoluwa Adegoke, spoke about growing the music ecosystem in Nigeria and its vision for the Recording Certification of Nigeria in the nearest future.

In August 2021, the Recording Certification of Nigeria became inactive after awarding 92 music videos. On 19 February 2023, Ayomide Oriowo, and Similoluwa Adegoke announce the TurnTable Certification System of Nigeria, as a flagship of TurnTable charts, a music recording chart monitoring Nigeria Top 100 songs, and Top 50 albums. The Nigeria music magazineTurnTable, establish the TurnTable Certification System of Nigeria to award Silver, Gold, Platinum, or Multi-Platinum plaques to eligible songs or albums in Nigeria.

"Digital" single certification
Digital awards:
Silver: 25,000 units
Gold: 50,000 units
Platinum: 100,000 units
Multi-Platinum: 200,000 units (increments of 100,000 thereafter)

The units are defined as:
 150 on-demand audio streams count as 1 unit

"Digital" album certification
Digital awards:
Silver: 12,500 units
Gold: 25,000 units
Platinum: 50,000 units
Multi-Platinum: 100,000 units (increments of 50,000 thereafter)

The units are defined as:
 1500 on-demand audio streams count as 1 unit

TCSN Gold certifications
Gold-certified albums and singles

TCSN Platinum certifications
Platinum-certified albums and singles

References 

2023 establishments in Nigeria
TurnTable
Music recording certifications